Datuk Juslie bin Ajirol (born 15 October 1953) is a Malaysian politician. He was the former Member of the Parliament of Malaysia for the Libaran constituency in Sabah, representing the United Malays National Organisation (UMNO) in the governing Barisan Nasional (BN) coalition from 1999 to 2018.

Election results

Honours
 :
 Commander of the Order of Kinabalu (P.G.D.K.) - Datuk (2002)

References 

Living people
1953 births
People from Sabah
Members of the Dewan Rakyat
United Malays National Organisation politicians
Malaysian Muslims
Commanders of the Order of Kinabalu